Jamie Webb (born 1 June 1994) is a British athlete who won the silver medal at the 2019 European Athletics Indoor Championships in the 800 metres. He won a bronze medal at the same Championships in 2021 in Torún, Poland. Outside of athletics he studies a PhD in Chemistry at Loughborough university having previously been a Chemistry teacher at the Harris Academy South Norwood, London. His 800-metre best is 1:44.14.

References

External links

English male middle-distance runners
1994 births
Living people